Brynrefail is a small village in Gwynedd, Wales which straddles the A4244 road roughly between Deiniolen and Llanberis. The village is in the Arfon (UK Parliament constituency) and the Gwynedd Council Ward of Penisa'r Waun. It is a short walk from the northern shore of Llyn Padarn lake.

The main street is mainly traditional terraced housing. Notable buildings include the village's Post Office, and the village's sole chapel, which is still in use.

The village is policed from Llanberis and has a dedicated Community Beat Manager.

History
In the 19th century, the village was built to house workers for the nearby Dinorwig slate quarry.

The village developed around the village smithy (yr efail in Welsh). The building that housed the smithy, which was built in 1776, still exists and has been converted into a cottage called "The Nook".

Brynrefail's development may have also been influenced by the quarry railway between Dinorwic Quarry and Y Felinheli (or the unofficial English name of Portdinorwic) and skirted around the village.

On the 1933 ½ inch Ordnance Survey map of the area (Sheet 11) and on the 1948 revision of the same map, the village is called Bryn-yr-Efail.

Some time ago, the village was home to the Ysgol Brynrefail before the campus was moved to the nearby town of Llanrug in the 1960s. The school's site was cleared in the 1990s.

Until 1960, the village's main street was the main road between Caernarfon and Llanberis until it was bypassed by the existing road to allow machinery to be conveyed to what was then the major construction site for the Dinorwig Power Station. This split the village, leaving the small Local Authority housing estate of Trem Eilian effectively stranded on the other side of what has later become a bustling main road.

In 2002, work began on a multi-use centre called "Caban". Opened in 2004, Caban is home to a café, a meeting room, which doubles as the village's chapel, and 13 business units. The café was mentioned in the Which? 2008 Good Food Guide.

External links

 Caban website
 North Wales Police 
 www.geograph.co.uk : photos of Brynrefail and area

Villages in Gwynedd
Llanddeiniolen
Mining communities in Wales